Saint Munde (or Mundus, Mund, Mond; died ) was a Scottish abbot in Argyll, Scotland.
There is some confusion between this saint and the much earlier Saint Fintan Munnu.
His feast day is 15 April.

Eilean Munde and Fintan Munnu

On July 6, 1770, Bishop Robert Forbes sailed up Loch Leven. He records: "We likewise come in view of the Island of St. Munde, who was Abbot and Confessor in Argyll…Upon this island is the ruin of a little chapel, all the four walls of which are still entire, dedicated to the same St. Munde."
Samuel Lewis in his Topographical Dictionary of Scotland says that the parish of Elean-Munde was so-called from St. Munde, who was an abbot in Argyll in the 10th century.
Another source says that  Eilean Munde, and four Kilmuns in Argyll, are said to be named after the Irish saint sometimes called Fintan Munnu in Scotland, but notes that this is by no means certain.
Fintan Munnu, Mun or Munn (died 635) was from Leinster in Ireland and was said to be a cousin of Columba.

Monks of Ramsgate account

The monks of St Augustine's Abbey, Ramsgate wrote in their Book of Saints (1921),

Butler's account

The hagiographer Alban Butler (1710–1773) wrote in his Lives of the Fathers, Martyrs, and Other Principal Saints under April 15,

O'Hanlon's analysis

John O'Hanlon (1821–1905) says in his Lives of the Irish saints under April 15,

Notes

Sources

 

 
 
 
 

Medieval Scottish saints
962 deaths